Events from the year 1747 in Wales.

Incumbents

Lord Lieutenant of North Wales (Lord Lieutenant of Anglesey, Caernarvonshire, Denbighshire, Flintshire, Merionethshire, Montgomeryshire) – George Cholmondeley, 3rd Earl of Cholmondeley 
Lord Lieutenant of Glamorgan – Charles Powlett, 3rd Duke of Bolton
Lord Lieutenant of Brecknockshire and Lord Lieutenant of Monmouthshire – Thomas Morgan
Lord Lieutenant of Cardiganshire – Wilmot Vaughan, 3rd Viscount Lisburne
Lord Lieutenant of Carmarthenshire – vacant until 1755
Lord Lieutenant of Pembrokeshire – Sir Arthur Owen, 3rd Baronet
Lord Lieutenant of Radnorshire – William Perry

Bishop of Bangor – Matthew Hutton (until 10 December)
Bishop of Llandaff – John Gilbert
Bishop of St Asaph – Samuel Lisle
Bishop of St Davids – The Hon. Richard Trevor

Events
August - In the general election, William Morgan of Tredegar Park becomes MP for Monmouthshire.
date unknown
Construction of the Usk Bridge (Usk), designed by William Edwards, begins.
Portrait-painter William Williams relocates to Philadelphia.
A Quaker meeting house is established at Quakers Friars in Bristol, the burial place of Llywelyn ap Dafydd.
James Relly reports on his missionary tour to Bristol, Bath, Gloucestershire, and Birmingham.

Arts and literature

New books
John Boydell - The Bridge Book

Music
William Williams Pantycelyn - Aleluia (hymns)

Births
January - Richard Fenton, poet and author (died 1821)
10 March - Iolo Morganwg, antiquarian, poet and literary forger (died 1826)
5 April - Sir Thomas Hanmer, 2nd Baronet (2nd creation) (died 1828)
6 April - Moses Griffith, artist (died 1819)

Deaths
February - Walter Lloyd, lawyer and politician, 68
9 April - John Myddelton, landowner and politician, 61
21 July - Robert Clavering, former Bishop of Llandaff, 70/71
probable - David Lloyd, clergyman and translator

References

1747 by country
1747 in Great Britain